Government Municipal Degree College, Faisalabad,, previously known as Lyallpur Khalsa College, (خالصہ کالج لائل پور) Faisalabad, is a degree college located in Faisalabad, Pakistan. on Faisalabad-Jaranwala Road near Abdullah pur.

It was founded by Master Sunder Singh Lyallpuri in 1908 in the building of Lyallpur Sangh Sabha as Khalsa High School.

The philanthropists of the city donated land and other resources for the establishment of the school. Noted Sikh statesman Master Tara Singh served as the first headmaster of the school and it was here that he got the title of 'Master' prefixed to his name. The school was later upgraded to a degree college in 1928.

Study program
Associate Degree in Arts 
Associate Degree Science

Subjects
Compulsory: English, Islamic Studies, Ethics, Pakistan Studies,
Elective: Physics, Political Science, Economics, History, Geography, Persian, Statistics, Urdu, Arabic, Computer Studies, Islamic Studies, Mathematics, Botany, Chemistry, Applied Psychology, Social Work,
Optional: Persian, Urdu, Arabic, Islamic Studies, Social Work

Notable alumni
Prithviraj Kapoor
Master Tara Singh

See also
Govt. College of Commerce, Abdullah Pur, Faisalabad

References

Schools in Faisalabad
Universities and colleges in Faisalabad District
1908 establishments in British India
Educational institutions established in 1908
Sikhism in Pakistan